Maiwa may refer to:

 Maiwa, Indonesia, a district in Sulawesi, Indonesia
 Maiwa language (Indonesia), a language of Sulawesi, Indonesia
 Maiwa language (Papuan), a language of Papua New Guinea

See also 
 Maiwa's Revenge, an English novel
 Maewa railway station, in New Zealand
 Maiva, a genus of butterflies
 Malwa, a region in India